= Mhing =

Mhing is a card game published by Suntex in 1982.

== Gameplay ==
Mhing is an abstract family card game based on Mahjong.

== Reviews ==
- Games #32
- 1982 Games 100 in Games
- 1983 Games 100
- 1984 Games 100
- 1985 Games 100
- 1986 Games 100
- Jeux & Stratégie #46
